The following lists events that have happened in 1804 in the Qajar dynasty.

Incumbents
 Monarch: Fat′h-Ali Shah Qajar

Events
 Battle of Ganja (1804)
 Russo-Persian War (1804–13) begins.

References

 
Persia
Years of the 19th century in Iran
1800s in Iran
Persia